Fernando João Lobo Aguiar (born 18 March 1972) is a Canadian former professional footballer who played as a defensive midfielder.

He was arguably Canada's second most successful player to have competed in Portugal, after Alex Bunbury, and was one of about a dozen Portuguese Canadians to have played football in the country. He amassed Primeira Liga totals of 138 matches and 13 goals over six seasons, appearing in the competition for Marítimo, Beira-Mar, Benfica, União de Leiria and Penafiel; he added 195/25 in the Segunda Liga.

Aguiar represented Canada internationally.

Club career
Born in Chaves, Aguiar moved to Canada at an early age, beginning his career in the Canadian Soccer League where he represented hometown's Toronto Blizzard. Although the league disbanded in 1992, he remained with the team for their only season in the American Professional Soccer League.

Dubbed RoboCop due to his powerful frame, Aguiar started competing in Europe in 1994, with Portuguese Primeira Liga club C.S. Marítimo. He had trouble making the lineups and subsequently dropped down to the second division where he spent four of the next five years, playing for C.D. Nacional, F.C. Maia and S.C. Beira-Mar, helping the latter achieve promotion in 2000 and subsequently stay in the top flight.

Aguiar's good form was noticed by S.L. Benfica, for whom he signed a six-month contract in December 2001, going on to play a somewhat important defensive role. On 25 January 2004 he scored the only goal in a 1–0 away win against Vitória de Guimarães (in the 90th minute), assisted by Miklós Fehér who would die in the hospital just hours later; he also helped the Lisbon-based side capture the 2004 Portuguese Cup.

After his cup-winning exploits, Aguiar transferred to Swedish club Landskrona BoIS. However, an injury and his high wages ruined the move, and he left after only a few months for F.C. Penafiel. In August 2005 he joined division two's Gondomar SC, representing it for four years and suffering relegation in the last, after which he was released at age 37, retiring shortly after.

On 13 November 2013, more than four years after his last match, Aguiar came out of retirement, moving to Pedrouços A.C. in the Porto regional divisions.

International career
Aguiar possessed both Portuguese and Canadian citizenship, but having grown up in Canada, he eventually featured for its national team. Ironically, he made his debut in a January 1995 SkyDome Cup match against Portugal, and went on to earn a total of 13 caps scoring no goals.

Aguiar represented Canada in four FIFA World Cup qualification matches. His final international appearance was in July 1999, with Saudi Arabia.

Honours
Benfica
Taça de Portugal: 2003–04

References

External links

1972 births
Living people
People from Chaves, Portugal
Canadian people of Portuguese descent
Portuguese emigrants to Canada
Naturalized citizens of Canada
Soccer people from Ontario
Portuguese footballers
Canadian soccer players
Association football midfielders
Canadian Soccer League (1987–1992) players
American Professional Soccer League players
Toronto Blizzard (1986–1993) players
Primeira Liga players
Liga Portugal 2 players
Segunda Divisão players
C.S. Marítimo players
C.D. Nacional players
F.C. Maia players
S.C. Beira-Mar players
S.L. Benfica footballers
U.D. Leiria players
F.C. Penafiel players
Gondomar S.C. players
Allsvenskan players
Landskrona BoIS players
Canada men's under-23 international soccer players
Canada men's international soccer players
Portuguese expatriate footballers
Canadian expatriate soccer players
Expatriate footballers in Sweden
Portuguese expatriate sportspeople in Sweden
Canadian expatriate sportspeople in Sweden
Sportspeople from Vila Real District